The 1946 UCI Road World Championships took place in Zürich, Switzerland.

Events Summary

References

 
UCI Road World Championships by year
W
R
International cycle races hosted by Switzerland